Sheshequin is an unincorporated community in Bradford County, in the U.S. state of Pennsylvania.

History
Sheshequin got its start as a Moravian mission in 1769. Sheshequin is a Native American name purported to mean "place of the rattle".

A post office was established at Sheshequin in 1810, and remained in operation until 1916.

References

Unincorporated communities in Pennsylvania
Unincorporated communities in Bradford County, Pennsylvania